The Bentvueghels (Dutch for "Birds of a Feather") were a society of mostly Dutch and Flemish artists active in Rome from about 1620 to 1720. They are also known as the Schildersbent ("painters' clique").

Activities

The members, which included painters, etchers, sculptors and poets, all lived in different parts of the city (mostly the parishes of Santa Maria del Popolo and San Lorenzo in Lucina in the north of the city) and came together for social and intellectual reasons.  The group was well known for its drunken, Bacchic initiation rituals (paid for by the initiate). These celebrations, sometimes lasting up to 24 hours, concluded with group marching to the church of Santa Costanza, known popularly at the time as the Temple of Bacchus. There they made libations to Bacchus before the porphyry sarcophagus of Constantina (now in the Vatican Museums), which was considered to be his tomb because of its Bacchic motifs. A list of its members may still be seen in one of this church's side chapels. This practice was finally banned by Pope Clement XI in 1720.  Although predominantly made up of Flemish and Dutch artists, a few other members were admitted, including Joachim von Sandrart and Valentin de Boulogne.

Despite the rowdy nature of these initiations, an intellectual quality was maintained.  Joachim von Sandrart, for example, wrote in his 1675–1679 book, Teutsche Academie der edlen Bau-, Bild und Malereikünste (German Academy of the Noble Arts of Architecture, Sculpture and Painting), that his "baptism" included "reasoned discourses, undertaken by French and Italians, as well as by Germans and Netherlanders, each in his own tongue." Also Cornelis de Bruijn wrote about the rituals he had to undergo in 1674 and made some engravings, which he published in 1698.

The Bentvueghels and the Accademia di San Luca
The Bentvueghels were frequently at odds with Rome's Accademia di San Luca ("Academy of Saint Luke"), which had the purpose of elevating the work of "artists" above that of craftsman. For this reason, before setting off for Italy, artists would first try to become members in their local Guild of St. Luke so they would have papers to show on arrival. Travel to Italy became a rite of passage for young Dutch and Flemish artists after publication of Karel van Mander's Schilder-boeck in 1604. Often encompassing a difficult and in many cases dangerous journey, artists would spend years getting to Italy, using their artistic talents to pay their way. Many never made it all the way to Italy, and many never attempted the trip back once they got there.

On arrival, many artists were therefore fairly established thanks to their work experience done along the way. However, equally many were still young and unknown. What they all did have by the time they arrived in Rome, was an overwhelming feeling of self-confidence in their ability to live by their own work, and membership in the Accademia had little relevance for them.

Traditionally, the low-brow qualities of the Bentvueghel's activities have been emphasized over their intellectual and artistic pursuits. David Levine suggests instead that "academic art-pedagogy, with its emphasis on repetitive copying, might well have struck members of the Bent [the Bentvueghels] as a low, mechanical process in contrast to their truly humanistic approach." Artists such as Pieter van Laer, however, belonged to both organisations.

Known members
The earliest-known publication listing the members is the book by Arnold Houbraken, an artist and engraver who never traveled to Italy, but who used the Bentvueghels membership list as a source for his book, De groote schouburgh der Nederlantsche konstschilders en schilderessen, in 1718. Whenever possible, he gives the nickname or bent of the painter in his biographical sketches.

The original members of the group were also depicted in a series of drawings made around 1620. Among those appearing in the drawings are Cornelis van Poelenburch, Bartholomeus Breenbergh, Dirck van Baburen, Paulus Bor, Cornelis Schut and Simon Ardé. Upon initiation, members were given aliases that were often classical gods and heroes, such as Bacchus, Cupid, Hector, Meleager, Cephalus, Pyramus, Orpheus, etc. Sometimes, however, the aliases were witty or semi-obscene in keeping with the general activities of the society.

Some of the members with known aliases or 'bent'-names:
Willem van Aelst – "Vogelverschrikker" ("Scarecrow")
Simon Ardé – "Tovenaer"  ("Wizard")
Jan Asselijn – "Crabbetje" ("Little crab"), because of a handicap on his right hand
Dirck van Baburen – "Biervlieg" ("Beer fly")
David Beck – "Gulden scepter"
Jan van Bijlert – "Aeneas" (one of the founders)
Cornelis Bloemaert – "Winter"
Jan Frans van Bloemen – "Orizonte"
Norbert van Bloemen – "Cefalus"
Pieter van Bloemen – "Standaart " or "Stendardo" ("Standard")
Jacques Blondeau – "Weyman" ("Meadow man")
Jan Boeckhorst – "Lange Jan" ("Tall John")
Paulus Bor – "Orlando"
Francis van Bossuit – "Waarnemer" ("Delegate")
Valentin de Boulogne – "Innamorato" ("Lover or Valentine")
Leonard Bramer – "Nestelghat" ("Fidget")
Bartholomeus Breenbergh – "Het Fret" ("the Ferret")
Abraham Brueghel – "Rijngraaf" or "Ringraaf" (the "Duke of the Rhine", which was an old aristocratic title in Northern Europe)
Jan Baptist Brueghel – "Meleager"
Cornelis de Bruijn – "Adonis"
Wouter Crabeth II – "Almanack" ("Almanac")
Tyman Arentsz. Cracht – "Botterkull" or "Botterkull" ("Butter ball")
Ignatius Croon – "Gaudtvinck" or "Goudtvinck" ("Bullfinch")
Willem Doudijns – "Diomedes"
Karel Dujardin – "Barba di Becco" or "Bokkebaart" ("Goat-beard")
Wybrand de Geest – "De Friesche Adelaar" (Frisian Eagle)
Abraham Genoels – "Archimedes"
Pieter Groenewegen – "Leeuw" ("Lion")
Reynier van Heuckelom – "Wolf"
Samuel van Hoogstraten – "Batavier" ("Batavian")
Pieter van der Hulst – "Zonnebloem" ("Sunflower")
Willem van Ingen – "Den Eersten" ("The first one")
Adriaen van der Kabel – "Geestigheid" ("Humour")
Gerard van Kuijl – "Stijgbeugel" ("Stirrup")
Pieter van Laer – "Il Bamboccio" ("Ugly puppet")
Jan Linsen – "Hermafrodiet" ("Hermaphrodite")
Jacob Leyssens – "Notenkraker" ("Nutcracker")
Hendrik Frans van Lint – "Studie" ("Study")
Johann Liss – "Pan"
 Willem Molijn – another founder
Jan Miel – "Honingh-Bie"/"Bieco" ("Honey Bee"), a pun on his surname.
Pieter Mulier the Younger – "Tempeest" ("Tempest")
Franciscus de Neve (II) – "Bloosaerken" ("Little blower")
Reinier van Persijn – "Narcissis" ("Narcissus")
Cornelis van Poelenburgh – "Satyr", also a founder
Christoffel Puytlinck – "Trechter" ("Funnel")
Luigi Primo – "Gentiel" or "Gentile" ("Gentle")
Otto Marseus van Schrieck – "Snuffelaer" ("Sniffer")
Jacob van Staverden – "Ijver" ("Diligence")
Herman van Swanevelt – "Heremiet" ("Hermit")
Augustinus Terwesten – "Patrysvogel" ("Partridge")
Robert du Val – "La Fortune"
Pieter Verbrugghen II – "Ballon" ("Balloon")
Karel van Vogelaer – "Distelbloem"
Jan Baptist Weenix – "Ratel" ("Rattle", because of a speech defect)
Theodoor Wilkens – "Goedewil" ("Good intention")
Matthias Withoos – "Calzetta bianca" ("White Hose")
Gaspar de Witte – "Grondel" ("Gudgeon")
Johan Zierneels – "Lely" or "Lelie" ("Lily")

See also
 The Guild of Romanists was a Flemish club, containing many artists, for those who had visited Rome and settled in Antwerp.

Notes

Sources 

 Some of the information here is taken from the corresponding Dutch article about the Bentvueghels.
 Haskell, Francis, Patrons and Painters: Art and Society in Baroque Italy, Yale University Press, 1980. 
 Kilian, Jennifer M., "Jan Baptist [Giovanni Battista] Weenix," Grove Art Online. Oxford University Press, [29 October 2007].
 Levine, David A., "The Bentvueghels: 'Bande Académique"," in IL60: Essays Honoring Irving Lavin on his Sixtieth Birthday, ed. Marilyn Aronberg Lavin. New York: Italica Press, 1990 (pp. 207–219). .
 Levine, David A., "Schildersbent [Bent]," Grove Art Online. Oxford University Press, [15 March 2007].
 Slive, Seymour. Dutch Painting 1600–1800. Yale University Press Pelican history of Art. New Haven, Conn: Yale University Press, 1995. .

 
Defunct clubs and societies
Arts organisations based in Italy
Organisations based in Rome
Artists from Rome
Baroque painters
Baroque sculptors
Baroque writers
Dutch artist groups and collectives
Belgian artist groups and collectives
German artist groups and collectives
Art of the Dutch Golden Age
Dutch Golden Age painters
Flemish Baroque painters
German Baroque painters
Dutch expatriates in Italy
Belgian expatriates in Italy
German expatriates in Italy